Inba Twinkle Lilly (also known as Itly) is a 2018 Indian Tamil-language heist comedy film written and directed by R. K. Vidhyadaran. The film stars three female characters (as grandmothers): Saranya Ponvannan, Kovai Sarala and Kalpana. Manobala, Chitra Lakshmanan, Mansoor Ali Khan, Ashmitha, Imman Annachi, and Devadarshini play supportive roles in the film.

The movie was titled as Itly, which was previously titled as Inba Twinkle Lilly as its full form and is the acronym of the three main female characters: Inba (Saranya), Twinkle (Sarala), and Lilly (Kalpana).

The film is produced by Babu Thooyavan under the production banner Appu Movies, and it also does not have any songs. The film was released on 29 June 2018 and received extremely negative reviews from the audience and critics upon its release.

Plot 
Inba's college-going granddaughter Ashmitha is suffering from a serious health problem, and she is in need of money costing to an amount of about 6 lakhs. Inba, along with her close friends Twinkle and Lilly, cooperate together to raise money, and while depositing money in the bank, they end up losing it due to a bank robbery led by a terrorist named Kalluthu and his gang. The bank manager refuses to help the trio as the money was not deposited at the time of the robbery. Then they find themselves in under tremendous pressure to raise money to rescue Ashmitha, so they hatch a plan to rob the bank where they lost their money along with China, who is Twinkle's love interest. Then, police and media covers the bank. After a lot of struggles, they come out safely. Afterwards, they get to know that Ashmitha has no disease, but she is stuck in a big problem. The problem is a gang which takes bad videos of women and asks for money. However, the video of Ashmitha is uploaded for not giving money. How they save Ashmitha's life forms the rest of the plot.

Cast 

 Saranya Ponvannan as Inba, close friend of Twinkle and Lilly
 Kovai Sarala as Twinkle, close friend of Inba and Lilly
 Kalpana as Lilly, close friend of Inba and Twinkle
 Manobala as China, Twinkle's love interest
 Mansoor Ali Khan as Kalluthu (Terrorist)
 Ashmitha as Ashmitha
 Chitra Lakshmanan as Bank Manager
 Imman Annachi as Inspector
 Devadarshini as Sub-Inspector
 Vennira Aadai Moorthy as Astrologer
 Swaminathan as Ashmitha's father
 Crane Manohar as Spiritual Astrologer
Pandu as Cine Personality a producer
Delhi Ganesh as Doctor
 Anu Krishna
 Athulya Ravi as reporter (uncredited)

Release 
The film was released on 29 June 2018, two years after the death of actress Kalpana who also starred in the film and was also her last feature film. The film was criticised for weak writing and poor joke sequences which caused negative impacts to the film at the box office.

References 

2010s Tamil-language films
2018 comedy-drama films
Indian comedy-drama films
Indian heist films